Matthew Caleb Stephenson is the Eli Goldston Professor of Law at Harvard Law School where he teaches he administrative law, legislation and regulation, anti-corruption law and the political economy of public law. His research interests include the application of positive political theory to public law.

Biography
Stephenson received his Juris Doctor and his Doctor of Philosophy (political science) from Harvard in 2003 and his Bachelor of Arts from Harvard in 1997. After graduation, Stephenson clerked for senior Judge Stephen Williams on the United States Court of Appeals for the District of Columbia Circuit and then for Justice Anthony Kennedy on the Supreme Court of the United States during the 2004–05 term.

In 2005, Stephenson joined the faculty of Harvard Law School as an assistant professor. In 2009, he was granted tenure and in 2010 was named a professor. In 2012, he received the Charles Fried Intellectual Diversity Award from the Law School. In 2018, he was named as the  Eli Goldston Professor of Law. He has served as a consultant to the World Bank and as Special Rapporteur for the Commission on Legal Empowerment of the Poor. In 2010, he was a visiting scholar at the University of Chicago.

He is the co-author with John F. Manning of the casebook Legislation and Regulation (Foundation Press, 2010). In his publications, Stephenson has argued that regulators should choose the optimal mix between policy preferences and fidelity to the text of a statute during agency rulemaking.

Stephenson is widely cited in the press as an expert in anti-corruption and international law.

See also
 List of law clerks of the Supreme Court of the United States (Seat 1)

References

Selected publications

Books
  1st edition, 2010; 2nd edition, 2013.

Articles

External links
 Globalanticorruptionblog.com
 Bio, Harvard Law School
 Bio, University of Chicago

Year of birth missing (living people)
Living people
21st-century American lawyers
American legal scholars
Harvard Law School alumni
Harvard Law School faculty
Law clerks of the Supreme Court of the United States
International law scholars